Miss USA World 1964 was the 3rd edition of the Miss USA World pageant and it was held at Cobo Hall in Detroit, Michigan and was won by Jeanne Marie Quinn of New York. She was crowned by outgoing titleholder, Michele Bettina Metrinko of New York City, NY. Quinn went on to represent the United States at the Miss World 1964 Pageant in London later that year. She finished in the Top 16 at Miss World.

Results

Placements

Special awards

Delegates
The Miss USA World 1964 delegates were:

 Alaska - Patricia Susan Marlin
 Annapolis, MD - Gloria Mathis
 Arizona - Sharee Sims
 Arkansas - Linda Davis
 Boston, MA - Diane Tibert
 California - Diana Dean
 Chicago, IL – Jana Flores
 Colorado - Margaret Bentley
 Columbus, OH - Sally Shrader
 Connecticut - Betty Stark
 Detroit, MI - Robin Hoag
 District of Columbia - Louise Wilson
 Florida - Carole Hale
 Georgia - Marshall Clarke
 Idaho - Desiree La Monte
 Illinois - Susan Rye
 Indiana - Linda Creek
 Iowa - Ellen Citko
 Kansas - Teri Blewitt
 Los Angeles, CA - Eddi Zippi
 Louisiana - Rebecca Larguier
 Maine - Jean Fuller
 Maryland - Laurie Mills
 Massachusetts - Monika Sands
 Michigan - Susan Lynne Pill
 Milwaukee, WI - Rita Mortenson
 Minnesota - Krisana Peterson
 Missouri - Adrienne Miller
 Morgantown, WV - Ingrid Wamsley
 Nebraska - Susan Phillips
 New Haven, CT - Lucille Cordane Douglas
 New Hampshire - Myrna Smith
 New Jersey - Genora Rosypal
 New York - Jeanne Marie Quinn
 New York City, NY - Ruth Stein
 North Carolina - Susan Harrill
 Ohio - Sharon Hoefling
 Oklahoma - Mickey Moffit
 Oregon - Maureen McCabe
 Pennsylvania - Sharon Weiner
 Philadelphia, PA - Helen Smith
 Rhode Island - Madalyn Davis
 San Francisco, CA - Susan Arnell
 South Bend, IN - Jacquelyn Forester
 South Carolina - Nancy Sanders
 Tennessee - Barbara Spangler
 Texas - Joan Neel
 Utah - Carla Starley
 Vermont - Judith Callison
 Washington - Betty Silcott
 West Virginia - Jonny Stephenson
 Wisconsin - Bozena Wilk
 Wyoming - Lou Ann Eden

Notes

Did not Compete

Crossovers
Contestants who competed in other beauty pageants:

Miss USA
1963: : Jeanne Marie Quinn (Top 15)
1964: : Patricia Susan Marlin (2nd Runner-Up)
1965: : Susan Lynne Pill (Top 15)

Miss American Beauty (Miss U.S. International)
1964: : Jeanne Marie Quinn (1st Runner-Up)

References

External links
Miss World Official Website
Miss World America Official Website

1964 beauty pageants
1964
1964 in Michigan